Jovanna Huguet is a Canadian actress.

Education 
She trained as a ballet dancer at the prestigious Royal Winnipeg Ballet School and the Walnut Hill School, in Natick, Massachusetts.

Career 
She made her acting debut in the 2003 award-winning Canadian independent film Part of the Game. After this, she guest starred on numerous television shows, including Supernatural, Smallville, Blade: The Series and Psych.

Personal life 
She speaks English, French and Spanish.

Filmography

Film

Television

External links

Jovanna's official site
Article on Jovanna's web series
Wapsi Girl
Sequential Tart article

References

Living people
Canadian people of Peruvian descent
Canadian film actresses
Canadian television actresses
Year of birth missing (living people)